D10, or similar, may refer to:

Transportation

Aircraft 
 Dewoitine D.10, a 1920s Dewoitine aircraft
 Albatros D.X, a 1918 German prototype single-seat fighter biplane
 Dunne D.10, a British Dunne aircraft
 Fokker D.X, a 1918 Dutch fighter aircraft

Ships 
 , a destroyer that was commissioned into the Argentine Navy in 1983
 , a 1941 British Royal Navy escort carrier
 , a 1936 British Royal Navy I-class destroyer
 , a 1943 British escort aircraft carrier

Vehicles and trains 
 Bavarian D X, an 1890 German saturated steam locomotive model
 LNER Class D10, a class of British steam locomotives 
 Allis-Chalmers D 10, a tractor
 Caldwell D-10, a car competing in Formula Super Vee
 Caterpillar D10, a track-type tractor

Roadways
 D10 road (Croatia)
 D10 motorway (Czech Republic)

Science and technology
 D10, or SMPTE 356M, a specification for a professional video format
 D-10 tank gun, a Soviet World War II 100mm tank gun
 Pentagonal trapezohedron used as a 10-sided gaming die
 d10, a d electron count
 ATC code D10, a classification of anti-acne preparations
D 10, slang for a 10-milligram diazepam tablet

Other uses
 D10 club of countries, a proposed forum of democratic countries
 D10 Slav Defense, a chess opening
 a ten-sided gaming die in the shape of a pentagonal trapezohedron

See also 
 Dio (disambiguation)
 DX (disambiguation)